was a town located in Iwafune District, Niigata Prefecture, Japan.

As of 2005, the town had an estimated population of about 7,243 and a density of 25.95 persons per km². The total area was 283.91 km².

On April 1, 2008, Sanpoku, along with the town of Arakawa, and the villages of Asahi and Kamihayashi (all from Iwafune District), was merged into the expanded city of Murakami.

It was an isolated town in the northernmost part of Niigata Prefecture, connected by the Uetsu Line (JR East) and National Route 7.

Neighboring municipalities were Tsuruoka in Yamagata Prefecture to the north, as well as Murakami and Asahi in Niigata to the south.

The official town tree was the Sugi and the official town flower was the Japanese Lily.

Dissolved municipalities of Niigata Prefecture
Murakami, Niigata